Armand Le Moal (4 May 1914 – 27 July 1999) was a French racing cyclist. He finished in last place in the 1939 Tour de France.

References

External links
 

1914 births
1999 deaths
French male cyclists
Sportspeople from Finistère
Cyclists from Brittany